The Australia women's national cricket team toured New Zealand in February and March 1961. They played against New Zealand in one Test match, which was drawn.

Squads

Tour Matches

2-day match: Auckland v Australia

1-day match: Matamata and Hamilton v Australia

1-day match: Wanganui v Australia

1-day match: Nelson v Australia

2-day match: Wellington v Australia

2-day match: Otago v Australia

1-day match: Southland v Australia

2-day match: Canterbury v Australia

WTest Series

1st Test

References

External links
Australia Women tour of New Zealand 1960/61 from Cricinfo

Women's international cricket tours of New Zealand
1961 in New Zealand cricket
Australia women's national cricket team tours